Gerald Gordon Mallett (born September 18, 1935 in Bonne Terre, Missouri) is an American former center fielder in Major League Baseball who played briefly for the Boston Red Sox during the 1959 season.

A two-sport star at Baylor University, Mallett was a Syracuse Nationals' fourth-round pick in the 1957 NBA Draft. Instead, he opted for baseball and signed as a free agent with Boston in the same year.

In a four game-career, Mallett was a .267 hitter (4-for-15) with a scored run and an RBI. He batted .244 over six minor league seasons, spending much of his career at the Double-A level.

External links

Basketball Reference
Baylor University Big-12
Retrosheet

1935 births
Living people
Allentown Red Sox players
American men's basketball players
Baseball players from Missouri
Baylor Bears baseball players
Baylor Bears men's basketball players
Boston Red Sox players
Indianapolis Indians players
Johnstown Red Sox players
Major League Baseball center fielders
Memphis Chickasaws players
Minneapolis Millers (baseball) players
Mobile Bears players
Oklahoma City Indians players
People from Bonne Terre, Missouri
Syracuse Nationals draft picks
Winston-Salem Red Sox players